Pelocoris balius is a species of creeping water bug in the family Naucoridae. It is found in Florida. In the Everglades, P. balius is locally common in shorter hydroperiod sites.

Pelocoris balius was originally described as a subspecies of P. femoratus by Ira La Rivers in 1970, but it was elevated to species by Robert Sites in 2015.

References

Articles created by Qbugbot
Insects described in 1970
Naucoridae